Vladimir Zapleshny is a former international speedway rider from the Soviet Union.

Speedway career 
Zapleshny reached the final of the Speedway World Championship in the 1973 Individual Speedway World Championship. He was one of four Russians that competed in the 1973 World final after strong performances in the Continental final and European final. During the 1973 Continental final he took the bronze medal and remarkably was one of the seven Russians that took the first seven places.

World final appearances

Individual World Championship
 1973 –  Chorzów, Silesian Stadium – 15th – 2pts

References 

Russian speedway riders
Living people
Year of birth missing (living people)